Zen is a school of Mahayana Buddhism that originated in China during the Tang dynasty, known as the Chan School (Chánzong 禪宗), and later developed into various sub-schools and branches. From China, Chán spread south to Vietnam and became Vietnamese Thiền, northeast to Korea to become Seon Buddhism, and east to Japan, becoming Japanese Zen.

The term Zen is derived from the Japanese pronunciation of the Middle Chinese word 禪 (chán), an abbreviation of 禪那 (chánnà), which is a Chinese transliteration of the Sanskrit word ध्यान dhyāna ("meditation"). Zen emphasizes rigorous self-restraint, meditation-practice and the subsequent insight into nature of mind (見性, Ch. jiànxìng, Jp. kensho, "perceiving the true nature") and nature of things (without arrogance or egotism), and the personal expression of this insight in daily life, especially for the benefit of others. As such, it de-emphasizes knowledge alone of sutras and doctrine, and favors direct understanding through spiritual practice and interaction with an accomplished teacher or Master.

Zen teaching draws from numerous sources of Sarvastivada meditation practice and Mahāyāna thought, especially Yogachara, the Tathāgatagarbha sūtras, the Laṅkāvatāra Sūtra, and the Huayan school, with their emphasis on Buddha-nature, totality, and the Bodhisattva-ideal. The Prajñāpāramitā literature, as well as Madhyamaka thought, have also been influential in the shaping of the apophatic and sometimes iconoclastic nature of Zen rhetoric.

Furthermore, the Chan School was also influenced by Taoist philosophy, especially Neo-Daoist thought.

Etymology
The word Zen is derived from the Japanese pronunciation (kana: ぜん) of the Middle Chinese word 禪 (Middle Chinese: [dʑian]), which in turn is derived from the Sanskrit word dhyāna (ध्यान), which can be approximately translated as "contemplation", "absorption", or "meditative state".

The actual Chinese term for the "Zen school" is 禪宗, while "Chan" just refers to the practice of meditation itself or the study of meditation though it is often used as an abbreviated form of Chánzong.

"Zen" is traditionally a proper noun as it usually describes a particular Buddhist sect. In more recent times, the lowercase "zen" is used when discussing the philosophy and was officially added to the Merriam-Webster dictionary in 2018.

Practice

Dhyāna

The practice of dhyana or meditation, especially sitting meditation (坐禪，Chinese: zuòchán, Japanese: zazen / ざぜん) is a central part of Zen Buddhism.

Chinese Buddhism
The practice of Buddhist meditation first entered China through the translations of An Shigao (fl. c. 148–180 CE), and Kumārajīva (334–413 CE), who both translated Dhyāna sutras, which were influential early meditation texts mostly based on the Yogacara (yoga praxis) teachings of the Kashmiri Sarvāstivāda circa 1st–4th centuries CE. Among the most influential early Chinese meditation texts include the Anban Shouyi Jing (安般守意經, Sutra on ānāpānasmṛti), the Zuochan Sanmei Jing (坐禪三昧經，Sutra of sitting dhyāna samādhi) and the Damoduoluo Chan Jing (達摩多羅禪經, Dharmatrata dhyāna sutra). These early Chinese meditation works continued to exert influence on Zen practice well into the modern era. For example, the 18th century Rinzai Zen master Tōrei Enji wrote a commentary on the Damoduoluo Chan Jing and used the Zuochan Sanmei Jing as source in the writing of this commentary. Tōrei believed that the Damoduoluo Chan Jing had been authored by Bodhidharma.

While dhyāna in a strict sense refers to the four dhyānas, in Chinese Buddhism, dhyāna may refer to various kinds of meditation techniques and their preparatory practices, which are necessary to practice dhyāna. The five main types of meditation in the Dhyāna sutras are ānāpānasmṛti (mindfulness of breathing); paṭikūlamanasikāra meditation (mindfulness of the impurities of the body); maitrī meditation (loving-kindness); the contemplation on the twelve links of pratītyasamutpāda; and contemplation on the Buddha. According to the modern Chan master Sheng Yen, these practices are termed the "five methods for stilling or pacifying the mind" and serve to focus and purify the mind, and support the development of the stages of dhyana. Chan also shares the practice of the four foundations of mindfulness and the Three Gates of Liberation (emptyness or śūnyatā, signlessness or animitta, and wishlessness or apraṇihita) with early Buddhism and classic Mahayana.

Pointing to the nature of the mind
According to Charles Luk, in the earliest traditions of Chán, there was no fixed method or formula for teaching meditation, and all instructions were simply heuristic methods, to point to the true nature of the mind, also known as Buddha-nature. According to Luk, this method is referred to as the "Mind Dharma", and exemplified in the story (in the Flower Sermon) of Śākyamuni Buddha holding up a flower silently, and Mahākāśyapa smiling as he understood. A traditional formula of this is, "Chán points directly to the human mind, to enable people to see their true nature and become buddhas."

Observing the mind
According to John McRae, "one of the most important issues in the development of early Ch'an doctrine is the rejection of traditional meditation techniques," that is, gradual self-perfection and the practices of contemplation on the body impurities and the four foundations of mindfulness. According to John R. McRae the "first explicit statement of the sudden and direct approach that was to become the hallmark of Ch'an religious practice" is associated with the East Mountain School. It is a method named "Maintaining the one without wavering" (shou-i pu i, 守一不移), the one being the nature of mind, which is equated with Buddha-nature. According to Sharf, in this practice, one turns the attention from the objects of experience, to the nature of mind, the perceiving subject itself, which is equated with Buddha-nature. According to McRae, this type of meditation resembles the methods of "virtually all schools of Mahāyāna Buddhism," but differs in that "no preparatory requirements, no moral prerequisites or preliminary exercises are given," and is "without steps or gradations. One concentrates, understands, and is enlightened, all in one undifferentiated practice." Sharf notes that the notion of "Mind" came to be criticised by radical subitists, and was replaced by "No Mind," to avoid any reifications.

Meditation manuals
Early Chan texts also teach forms of meditation that are unique to Mahāyāna Buddhism, for example, the Treatise on the Essentials of Cultivating the Mind, which depicts the teachings of the 7th-century East Mountain school teaches a visualization of a sun disk, similar to that taught in the Sutra of the Contemplation of the Buddha Amitáyus.

Later Chinese Buddhists developed their own meditation manuals and texts, one of the most influential being the works of the Tiantai patriarch, Zhiyi. His works seemed to have exerted some influence on the earliest meditation manuals of the Chán school proper, an early work being the widely imitated and influential Tso-chan-i (Principles of sitting meditation, c. 11th century), which doesn't outline a vipassana practice which leads to wisdom (prajña), but only recommends practicing samadhi which will lead to the discovery of inherent wisdom already present in the mind.

Common contemporary meditation forms

Mindfulness of breathing

During sitting meditation (坐禅, Ch. zuòchán, Jp. zazen, Ko. jwaseon), practitioners usually assume a position such as the lotus position, half-lotus, Burmese, or seiza, often using the dhyāna mudrā. Often, a square or round cushion placed on a padded mat is used to sit on; in some other cases, a chair may be used.

To regulate the mind, Zen students are often directed towards counting breaths. Either both exhalations and inhalations are counted, or one of them only. The count can be up to ten, and then this process is repeated until the mind is calmed. Zen teachers like Omori Sogen teach a series of long and deep exhalations and inhalations as a way to prepare for regular breath meditation. Attention is usually placed on the energy center (dantian) below the navel. Zen teachers often promote diaphragmatic breathing, stating that the breath must come from the lower abdomen (known as hara or tanden in Japanese), and that this part of the body should expand forward slightly as one breathes. Over time the breathing should become smoother, deeper and slower. When the counting becomes an encumbrance, the practice of simply following the natural rhythm of breathing with concentrated attention is recommended.

Silent Illumination and shikantaza
A common form of sitting meditation is called "Silent illumination" (Ch. mòzhào, Jp. mokushō). This practice was traditionally promoted by the Caodong school of Chinese Chan and is associated with Hongzhi Zhengjue (1091—1157) who wrote various works on the practice. This method derives from the Indian Buddhist practice of the union (Skt. yuganaddha) of śamatha and vipaśyanā.

In Hongzhi's practice of "nondual objectless meditation" the mediator strives to be aware of the totality of phenomena instead of focusing on a single object, without any interference, conceptualizing, grasping, goal seeking, or subject-object duality.

This practice is also popular in the major schools of Japanese Zen, but especially Sōtō, where it is more widely known as Shikantaza (Ch. zhǐguǎn dǎzuò, "Just sitting"). Considerable textual, philosophical, and phenomenological justification of the practice can be found throughout the work of the Japanese Sōtō Zen thinker Dōgen, especially in his Shōbōgenzō, for example in the "Principles of Zazen" and the "Universally Recommended Instructions for Zazen". While the Japanese and the Chinese forms are similar, they are distinct approaches.

Hua Tou and Kōan contemplation

During the Tang dynasty, gōng'àn (Jp. kōan) literature became popular. Literally meaning "public case", they were stories or dialogues, describing teachings and interactions between Zen masters and their students. These anecdotes give a demonstration of the master's insight. Kōan are meant to illustrate the non-conceptual insight (prajña) that the Buddhist teachings point to. During the Sòng dynasty, a new meditation method was popularized by figures such as Dahui, which was called kanhua chan ("observing the phrase" meditation), which referred to contemplation on a single word or phrase (called the huatou, "critical phrase") of a gōng'àn. In Chinese Chan and Korean Seon, this practice of "observing the huatou" (hwadu in Korean) is a widely practiced method. It was taught by the influential Seon master Chinul (1158–1210), and modern Chinese masters like Sheng Yen and Xuyun. Yet, while Dahui famously criticised "silent illumination," he nevertheless "did not completely condemn quiet-sitting; in fact, he seems to have recommended it, at least to his monastic disciples."

In the Japanese Rinzai school, kōan introspection developed its own formalized style, with a standardized curriculum of kōans, which must be studied and "passed" in sequence. This process includes standardized "checking questions" (sassho) and common sets of "capping phrases" (jakugo) or poetry citations that are memorized by students as answers. The Zen student's mastery of a given kōan is presented to the teacher in a private interview (referred to in Japanese as dokusan, daisan, or sanzen). While there is no unique answer to a kōan, practitioners are expected to demonstrate their spiritual understanding through their responses. The teacher may approve or disapprove of the answer and guide the student in the right direction. The interaction with a teacher is central in Zen, but makes Zen practice also vulnerable to misunderstanding and exploitation. Kōan-inquiry may be practiced during zazen (sitting meditation), kinhin (walking meditation), and throughout all the activities of daily life. The goal of the practice is often termed kensho (seeing one's true nature), and is to be followed by further practice to attain a natural, effortless, down-to-earth state of being, the "ultimate liberation", "knowing without any kind of defilement".

Kōan practice is particularly emphasized in Rinzai, but it also occurs in other schools or branches of Zen depending on the teaching line.

Nianfo chan 
Nianfo (Jp. nembutsu, from Skt. buddhānusmṛti "recollection of the Buddha") refers to the recitation of the Buddha's name, in most cases the Buddha Amitabha. In Chinese Chan, the Pure Land practice of nianfo based on the phrase Nāmó Āmítuófó (Homage to Amitabha) is a widely practiced form of Zen meditation which came to be known as "Nianfo Chan" (念佛禪). Nianfo was practiced and taught by early Chan masters, like Daoxin (580-651), who taught that one should "bind the mind to one buddha and exclusively invoke his name". The practice is also taught in Shenxiu's Kuan-hsin lun (觀心論). 

The Ch’uan fa-pao chi (傳法寶紀, Taisho # 2838, ca. 713), one of the earliest Chan histories, also shows this practice was widespread in early Chan:Coming to the generation of [Hung-]jen, [Fa-]ju and Ta-tung, the dharma-door was wide open to followers, regardless of their capacities. All immediately invoked the name of the Buddha so as to purify the mind.  Evidence for the practice of nianfo chan can also be found in Changlu Zongze's (died c. 1107) Chanyuan qinggui (The Rules of Purity in the Chan Monastery), perhaps the most influential Ch’an monastic code in East Asia.  

Nianfo continued to be taught as a form of Chan meditation by later Chinese figures such as Yongming Yanshou, Zhongfen Mingben, and Tianru Weize. During the late Ming, the tradition of Nianfo Chan meditation was continued by figures such as Yunqi Zhuhong and Hanshan Deqing. Chan figures like Yongming Yanshou generally advocated a view called “mind-only Pure Land” (wei-hsin ching-t’u), which held that the Buddha and the Pure Land are just mind. 

This practice, as well as its adaptation into the "nembutsu kōan" was also used by the Japanese Ōbaku school of Zen. Nianfo chan is also practiced in Vietnamese Thien.

Bodhisattva virtues and vows

Since Zen is a form of Mahayana Buddhism, it is grounded on the schema of the bodhisattva path, which is based on the practice of the "transcendent virtues" or "perfections" (Skt. pāramitā, Ch. bōluómì, Jp. baramitsu) as well as the taking of the bodhisattva vows. The most widely used list of six virtues is: generosity, moral training (incl. five precepts), patient endurance, energy or effort, meditation (dhyana), wisdom. An important source for these teachings is the Avatamsaka sutra, which also outlines the grounds (bhumis) or levels of the bodhisattva path. The pāramitās are mentioned in early Chan works such as Bodhidharma's Two entrances and four practices and are seen as an important part of gradual cultivation (jianxiu) by later Chan figures like Zongmi.

An important element of this practice is the formal and ceremonial taking of refuge in the three jewels, bodhisattva vows and precepts. Various sets of precepts are taken in Zen including the five precepts, "ten essential precepts", and the sixteen bodhisattva precepts. This is commonly done in an initiation ritual (Ch. shòu jiè, Jp. Jukai, Ko. sugye, "receiving the precepts"), which is also undertaken by lay followers and marks a layperson as a formal Buddhist.

The Chinese Buddhist practice of fasting (zhai), especially during the uposatha days (Ch. zhairi, "days of fasting") can also be an element of Chan training. Chan masters may go on extended absolute fasts, as exemplified by master Hsuan Hua's 35 day fast, which he undertook during the Cuban missile crisis for the generation of merit.

Physical cultivation

Traditional martial arts, like Japanese archery, other forms of Japanese budō and Chinese martial arts (gōngfu) have also been seen as forms of zen praxis. This tradition goes back to the influential Shaolin Monastery in Henan, which developed the first institutionalized form of gōngfu. By the late Ming, Shaolin gōngfu was very popular and widespread, as evidenced by mentions in various forms of Ming literature (featuring staff wielding fighting monks like Sun Wukong) and historical sources, which also speak of Shaolin's impressive monastic army that rendered military service to the state in return for patronage. These Shaolin practices, which began to develop around the 12th century, were also traditionally seen as a form of Chan Buddhist inner cultivation (today called wuchan, "martial chan"). The Shaolin arts also made use of Taoist physical exercises (taoyin) breathing and energy cultivation (qìgōng) practices. They were seen as therapeutic practices, which improved "internal strength" (neili), health and longevity (lit. "nourishing life" yangsheng), as well as means to spiritual liberation.

The influence of these Taoist practices can be seen in the work of Wang Zuyuan (ca. 1820–after 1882), a scholar and minor bureaucrat who studied at Shaolin. Wang's Illustrated Exposition of Internal Techniques (Neigong tushuo) shows how Shaolin exercises were drawn from Taoist methods like those of the Yi jin jing and Eight pieces of brocade, possibly influenced by the Ming dynasty's spirit of religious syncretism. According to the modern Chan master Sheng Yen, Chinese Buddhism has adopted internal cultivation exercises from the Shaolin tradition as ways to "harmonize the body and develop concentration in the midst of activity." This is because, "techniques for harmonizing the vital energy are powerful assistants to the cultivation of samadhi and spiritual insight." Korean Seon also has developed a similar form of active physical training, termed Sunmudo.

In Japan, the classic combat arts (budō) and zen practice have been in contact since the embrace of Rinzai Zen by the Hōjō clan in the 13th century, who applied zen discipline to their martial practice. One influential figure in this relationship was the Rinzai priest Takuan Sōhō who was well known for his writings on zen and budō addressed to the samurai class (especially his The Unfettered Mind) . 

The Rinzai school also adopted certain Chinese practices which work with qi (which are also common in Taoism). They were introduced by Hakuin (1686–1769) who learned various techniques from a hermit named Hakuyu who helped Hakuin cure his "Zen sickness" (a condition of physical and mental exhaustion). These energetic practices, known as naikan, are based on focusing the mind and one's vital energy (ki) on the tanden (a spot slightly below the navel).

The arts

Certain arts such as painting, calligraphy, poetry, gardening, flower arrangement, tea ceremony and others have also been used as part of zen training and practice. Classical Chinese arts like brush painting and calligraphy were used by Chan monk painters such as Guanxiu and Muqi Fachang to communicate their spiritual understanding in unique ways to their students. Zen paintings are sometimes termed zenga in Japanese. Hakuin is one Japanese Zen master who was known to create a large corpus of unique sumi-e (ink and wash paintings) and Japanese calligraphy to communicate zen in a visual way. His work and that of his disciples were widely influential in Japanese Zen. Another example of Zen arts can be seen in the short lived Fuke sect of Japanese Zen, which practiced a unique form of "blowing zen" (suizen) by playing the shakuhachi bamboo flute.

Intensive group practice
Intensive group meditation may be practiced by serious Zen practitioners. In the Japanese language, this practice is called sesshin. While the daily routine may require monks to meditate for several hours each day, during the intensive period they devote themselves almost exclusively to zen practice. The numerous 30–50 minute long sitting meditation (zazen) periods are interwoven with rest breaks, ritualized formal meals (Jp. oryoki), and short periods of work (Jp. samu) that are to be performed with the same state of mindfulness. In modern Buddhist practice in Japan, Taiwan, and the West, lay students often attend these intensive practice sessions or retreats. These are held at many Zen centers or temples.

Chanting and rituals

Most Zen monasteries, temples and centers perform various rituals, services and ceremonies (such as initiation ceremonies and funerals), which are always accompanied by the chanting of verses, poems or sutras. There are also ceremonies that are specifically for the purpose of sutra recitation (Ch. niansong, Jp. nenju) itself.

Zen schools may have an official sutra book that collects these writings (in Japanese, these are called kyohon). Practitioners may chant major Mahayana sutras such as the Heart Sutra and chapter 25 of the Lotus Sutra (often called the "Avalokiteśvara Sutra"). Dhāraṇīs and Zen poems may also be part of a Zen temple liturgy, including texts like the Song of the Precious Mirror Samadhi, the Sandokai, the Nīlakaṇṭha Dhāraṇī, and the Uṣṇīṣa Vijaya Dhāraṇī Sūtra.

The butsudan is the altar in a monastery, temple or a lay person's home, where offerings are made to the images of the Buddha, bodhisattvas and deceased family members and ancestors. Rituals usually center on major Buddhas or bodhisattvas like Avalokiteśvara (see Guanyin), Kṣitigarbha and Manjushri.

An important element in Zen ritual practice is the performance of ritual prostrations (Jp. raihai) or bows.

One popular form of ritual in Japanese Zen is Mizuko kuyō (Water child) ceremonies, which are performed for those who have had a miscarriage, stillbirth, or abortion. These ceremonies are also performed in American Zen Buddhism.

A widely practiced ritual in Chinese Chan is variously called the "Rite for releasing the hungry ghosts" or the "Releasing flaming mouth". The ritual might date back to the Tang dynasty, and was very popular during the Ming and Qing dynasties, when Chinese Esoteric Buddhist practices became diffused throughout Chinese Buddhism. The Chinese holiday of the Ghost Festival might also be celebrated with similar rituals for the dead. These ghost rituals are a source of contention in modern Chinese Chan, and masters such as Sheng Yen criticize the practice for not having "any basis in Buddhist teachings".

Another important type of ritual practiced in Zen are various repentance or confession rituals (Jp. zange) that were widely practiced in all forms of Chinese Mahayana Buddhism. One popular Chan text on this is known as the Emperor Liang Repentance Ritual, composed by Chan master Baozhi. Dogen also wrote a treatise on repentance, the Shushogi. Other rituals could include rites dealing with local deities (kami in Japan), and ceremonies on Buddhist holidays such as Buddha's Birthday.

Funerals are also an important ritual and are a common point of contact between Zen monastics and the laity. Statistics published by the Sōtō school state that 80 percent of Sōtō laymen visit their temple only for reasons having to do with funerals and death. Seventeen percent visit for spiritual reasons and 3 percent visit a Zen priest at a time of personal trouble or crisis.

Esoteric practices
Depending on the tradition, esoteric methods such as mantra and dhāraṇī are also used for different purposes including meditation practice, protection from evil, invoking great compassion, invoking the power of certain bodhisattvas, and are chanted during ceremonies and rituals. In the Kwan Um school of Zen for example, a mantra of Guanyin ("Kwanseum Bosal") is used during sitting meditation. The Heart Sutra Mantra is also another mantra that is used in Zen during various rituals. Another example is the Mantra of Light (kōmyō shingon), which is common in Japanese Soto Zen and was derived from the Shingon sect.

In Chinese Chan, the usage of esoteric mantras in Zen goes back to the Tang dynasty. There is evidence that Chan Buddhists adopted practices from Chinese Esoteric Buddhism in findings from Dunhuang. According to Henrik Sørensen, several successors of Shenxiu (such as Jingxian and Yixing) were also students of the Zhenyan (Mantra) school. Influential esoteric dhāraṇī, such as the Uṣṇīṣa Vijaya Dhāraṇī Sūtra and the Nīlakaṇṭha Dhāraṇī, also begin to be cited in the literature of the Baotang school during the Tang dynasty. Many mantras have been preserved since the Tang period and continue to be practiced in modern Chan monasteries. One common example is the Śūraṅgama Mantra,which has been heavily propagated by various prominent Chan monks, such as Venerable Hsuan Hua who founded the City of Ten Thousand Buddhas. Another example of esoteric rituals practiced by the Chan school is the Mengshan Rite for Feeding Hungry Ghosts, which is practiced by both monks and laypeople during the Hungry Ghost Festival. Chan repentance rituals, such as the Liberation Rite of Water and Land, also involve various esoteric aspects, including the invocation of esoteric deities such as the Five Wisdom Buddhas and the Ten Wisdom Kings.

There is documentation that monks living at Shaolin temple during the eighth century performed esoteric practices there such as mantra and dharani, and that these also influenced Korean Seon Buddhism. During the Joseon dynasty, the Seon school was not only the dominant tradition in Korea, but it was also highly inclusive and ecumenical in its doctrine and practices, and this included Esoteric Buddhist lore and rituals (that appear in Seon literature from the 15th century onwards). According to Sørensen, the writings of several Seon masters (such as Hyujeong) reveal they were esoteric adepts.

In Japanese Zen, the use of esoteric practices within Zen is sometimes termed "mixed Zen" (kenshū zen 兼修禪), and the figure of Keizan Jōkin (1264–1325) is seen as introducing this into the Soto school. The Japanese founder of the Rinzai school, Myōan Eisai (1141–1215) was also a well known practitioner of esoteric Buddhism and wrote various works on the subject.

According to William Bodiford, a very common dhāraṇī in Japanese Zen is the Śūraṅgama spell (Ryōgon shu 楞嚴呪; T. 944A), which is repeatedly chanted during summer training retreats as well as at "every important monastic ceremony throughout the year" in Zen monasteries. Some Zen temples also perform esoteric rituals, such as the homa ritual, which is performed at the Soto temple of Eigen-ji (in Saitama prefecture). As Bodiford writes, "perhaps the most notable examples of this phenomenon is the ambrosia gate (kanro mon 甘露門) ritual performed at every Sōtō Zen temple", which is associated feeding hungry ghosts, ancestor memorial rites and the ghost festival. Bodiford also notes that formal Zen rituals of Dharma transmission often involve esoteric initiations.

Doctrine

Zen teachings can be likened to "the finger pointing at the moon". Zen teachings point to the moon, awakening, "a realization of the unimpeded interpenetration of the dharmadhatu". But the Zen-tradition also warns against taking its teachings, the pointing finger, to be this insight itself.

Buddhist Mahayana influences
Though Zen-narrative states that it is a "special transmission outside scriptures", which "did not stand upon words", Zen does have a rich doctrinal background that is firmly grounded in the Buddhist tradition. It was thoroughly influenced by Mahayana teachings on the bodhisattva path, Chinese Madhyamaka (Sānlùn), Yogacara (Wéishí), Prajñaparamita, the Laṅkāvatāra Sūtra, and other Buddha nature texts. The influence of Madhyamaka and Prajñaparamita can be discerned in the stress on non-conceptual wisdom (prajña) and the apophatic language of Zen literature.

The philosophy of the Huayan school also had an influence on Chinese Chan. One example is the Huayan doctrine of the interpenetration of phenomena, which also makes use of native Chinese philosophical concepts such as principle (li) and phenomena (shi). The Huayan theory of the Fourfold Dharmadhatu also influenced the Five Ranks of Dongshan Liangjie (806–869), the founder of the Caodong Chan lineage.

Buddha-nature and subitism
Central in the doctrinal development of Chan Buddhism was the notion of Buddha-nature, the idea that the awakened mind of a Buddha is already present in each sentient being (pen chueh in Chinese Buddhism, hongaku in Japanese Zen). This Buddha-nature was initially equated with the nature of mind, while later Chan-teachings evaded any reification by rejecting any positivist terminology. The idea of the immanent character of the Buddha-nature took shape in a characteristic emphasis on direct insight into, and expression of this Buddha-nature. It led to a reinterpretation and Sinification of Indian meditation terminology, and an emphasis on subitism, the idea that the Buddhist teachings and practices are comprehended and expressed "sudden," c.q. "in one glance," "uncovered all together," or "together, completely, simultaneously," in contrast to gradualism, "successively or being uncovered one after the other." The emphasis on subitism led to the idea that "enlightenment occurs in a single transformation that is both total and instantaneous" (Ch. shih-chueh).

While the attribution of gradualism, attributed by Shenhui to a concurring faction, was a rhetoric device, it led to a conceptual dominance in the Chan-tradition of subitism, in which any charge of gradualism was to be avoided. This "rhetorical purity" was hard to reconcile conceptually with the actual practice of meditation, and left little place in Zen texts for the description of actual meditation practices, apparently rejecting any form of practice. Instead, those texts directly pointed to and expressed this awakened nature, giving way to the paradoxically nature of encounter dialogue and koans.

Caodong/Sōtō/Tào Động

Sōtō is the Japanese line of the Chinese Caodong school, which was founded during the Tang Dynasty by Dongshan Liangjie. The Sōtō-school has de-emphasized kōans since Gentō Sokuchū (circa 1800), and instead emphasized shikantaza. Dogen, the founder of Soto in Japan, emphasized that practice and awakening cannot be separated. By practicing shikantaza, attainment and Buddhahood are already being expressed. For Dogen, zazen, or shikantaza, is the essence of Buddhist practice. Gradual cultivation was also recognized by Dongshan Liangjie.

A lineage also exists in Vietnam, founded by 17th-century Chan master Thông Giác Đạo Nam. In Vietnamese, the school is known as "Tào Động."

Linji/Rinzai

The Rinzai school is the Japanese lineage of the Chinese Linji school, which was founded during the Tang dynasty by Linji Yixuan. The Rinzai school emphasizes kensho, insight into one's true nature. This is followed by so-called post-satori practice, further practice to attain Buddhahood.

Other Zen-teachers have also expressed sudden insight followed by gradual cultivation. Jinul, a 12th-century Korean Seon master, followed Zongmi, and also emphasized that insight into our true nature is sudden, but is to be followed by practice to ripen the insight and attain full buddhahood. This is also the standpoint of the contemporary Sanbo Kyodan, according to whom kenshō is at the start of the path to full enlightenment.

To attain this primary insight and to deepen it, zazen and kōan-study is deemed essential. This trajectory of initial insight followed by a gradual deepening and ripening is expressed by Linji in his Three Mysterious Gates and Hakuin Ekaku's Four Ways of Knowing. Another example of depiction of stages on the path are the Ten Bulls, which detail the steps on the path.

Scripture

The role of the scripture
Zen is deeply rooted in the teachings and doctrines of Mahāyāna Buddhism. Classic Zen texts, such as the Platform sutra, contain numerous references to Buddhist canonical sutras. According to Sharf, Zen monastics "are expected to become familiar with the classics of the Zen canon". A review of the early historical documents and literature of early Zen masters clearly reveals that they were well versed in numerous Mahāyāna sūtras, as well as Mahayana Buddhist philosophy such as Madhyamaka. 

Nevertheless, Zen is often pictured as anti-intellectual. This picture of Zen emerged during the Song Dynasty (960–1297), when Chán became the dominant form of Buddhism in China, and gained great popularity among the educated and literary classes of Chinese society. The use of koans, which are highly stylized literary texts, reflects this popularity among the higher classes. The famous saying "do not establish words and letters", attributed in this period to Bodhidharma,

What the Zen tradition emphasizes is that the enlightenment of the Buddha came not through conceptualization but rather through direct insight. But direct insight has to be supported by study and understanding (hori) of the Buddhist teachings and texts. Intellectual understanding without practice is called yako-zen, "wild fox Zen", but "one who has only experience without intellectual understanding is a zen temma, 'Zen devil.

Grounding Chán in scripture
The early Buddhist schools in China were each based on a specific sutra. At the beginning of the Tang Dynasty, by the time of the Fifth Patriarch Hongren (601–674), the Zen school became established as a separate school of Buddhism. It had to develop a doctrinal tradition of its own to ascertain its position and to ground its teachings in a specific sutra. Various sutras were used for this even before the time of Hongren: the Śrīmālādevī Sūtra (Huike), Awakening of Faith (Daoxin), the Lankavatara Sutra (East Mountain School), the Diamond Sutra (Shenhui), and the Platform Sutra. The Chan tradition drew inspiration from a variety of sources and thus did not follow any single scripture over the others. Subsequently, the Zen tradition produced a rich corpus of written literature, which has become a part of its practice and teaching. Other influential sutras are the Vimalakirti Sutra, Avatamsaka Sutra, the Shurangama Sutra, and the Mahaparinirvana Sutra.

In his analysis of the works of the influential Hongzhou school of Chan, Mario Poceski notes that they cite the following Mahayana sutras: the Lotus Sutra 法華經, the Huayan 華嚴經, the Nirvana 涅盤經, the Laṅkāvatāra 楞伽經, the Prajñāpāramitās 般若經, the Mahāratnakūta 大寶積經, the Mahāsamnipāta 大集經, and the Vimalakīrti 維摩經.

Literature

The Zen-tradition developed a rich textual tradition, based on the interpretation of the Buddhist teachings and the recorded sayings of Zen-masters. Important texts are the Platform Sutra (8th century), attributed to Huineng ; the Chán transmission records, teng-lu, such as The Records of the Transmission of the Lamp (Ching-te ch'uan-teng lu), compiled by Tao-yün and published in 1004; the "yü-lü" genre consisting of the recorded sayings of the masters, and the encounter dialogues; the koan-collections, such as The Gateless Barrier and the Blue Cliff Record.

Organization and institutions

Religion is not only an individual matter, but "also a collective endeavour". Though individual experience and the iconoclastic picture of Zen are emphasised in the Western world, the Zen-tradition is maintained and transferred by a high degree of institutionalisation and hierarchy. In Japan, modernity has led to criticism of the formal system and the commencement of lay-oriented Zen-schools such as the Sanbo Kyodan and the Ningen Zen Kyodan. How to organize the continuity of the Zen-tradition in the West, constraining charismatic authority and the derailment it may bring on the one hand, and maintaining the legitimacy and authority by limiting the number of authorized teachers on the other hand, is a challenge for the developing Zen-communities in the West.

Narratives

The Chán of the Tang Dynasty, especially that of Mazu and Linji with its emphasis on "shock techniques", in retrospect was seen as a golden age of Chán. It became dominant during the Song Dynasty, when Chán was the dominant form of Buddhism in China, due to support from the Imperial Court. This picture has gained great popularity in the West in the 20th century, especially due to the influence of D.T. Suzuki, and further popularized by Hakuun Yasutani and the Sanbo Kyodan. This picture has been challenged, and complemented, since the 1970s by modern scientific research on Zen.

Modern scientific research on the history of Zen discerns three main narratives concerning Zen, its history and its teachings: Traditional Zen Narrative (TZN), Buddhist Modernism (BM), Historical and Cultural Criticism (HCC). An external narrative is Nondualism, which claims Zen to be a token of a universal nondualist essence of religions.

History

Chinese Chán

Zen (Chinese: Chán 禪) Buddhism, as we know it today, is the result of a long history, with many changes and contingent factors. Each period had different types of Zen, some of which remained influential, while others vanished. The history of Chán in China is divided into various periods by different scholars, who generally distinguish a classical phase and a post-classical period.

Ferguson distinguishes three periods from the 5th century into the 13th century:
 The Legendary period, from Bodhidharma in the late 5th century to the An Lushan Rebellion around 765 CE, in the middle of the Tang Dynasty. Little written information is left from this period. It is the time of the Six Patriarchs, including Bodhidharma and Huineng, and the legendary "split" between the Northern and the Southern School of Chán.
 The Classical period, from the end of the An Lushan Rebellion around 765 CE to the beginning of the Song Dynasty around 950 CE. This is the time of the great masters of Chán, such as Mazu Daoyi and Linji Yixuan, and the creation of the yü-lü genre, the recordings of the sayings and teachings of these great masters.
 The Literary period, from around 950 to 1250, which spans the era of the Song Dynasty (960–1279). In this time the gongan-collections were compiled, collections of sayings and deeds by the famous masters, appended with poetry and commentary. This genre reflects the influence of literati on the development of Chán. This period idealized the previous period as the "golden age" of Chán, producing the literature in which the spontaneity of the celebrated masters was portrayed.

Although McRae has reservations about the division of Chán-history in phases or periods, he nevertheless distinguishes four phases in the history of Chán:
 Proto-Chán (c. 500–600) (Southern and Northern Dynasties (420 to 589) and Sui Dynasty (589–618 CE)). In this phase, Chán developed in multiple locations in northern China. It was based on the practice of dhyana and is connected to the figures of Bodhidharma and Huike. Its principal text is the Two Entrances and Four Practices, attributed to Bodhidharma.
Early Chán (c. 600–900) (Tang Dynasty (618–907 CE)). In this phase Chán took its first clear contours. Prime figures are the fifth patriarch Daman Hongren (601–674), his dharma-heir Yuquan Shenxiu (606?–706), the sixth patriarch Huineng (638–713), protagonist of the quintessential Platform Sutra, and Shenhui (670–762), whose propaganda elevated Huineng to the status of sixth patriarch. Prime factions are the Northern School, Southern School and Oxhead school.
 Middle Chán (c. 750–1000) (from An Lushan Rebellion (755–763) till Five Dynasties and Ten Kingdoms period (907–960/979)). In this phase developed the well-known Chán of the iconoclastic zen-masters. Prime figures are Mazu Daoyi (709–788), Shitou Xiqian (710–790), Linji Yixuan (died 867), and Xuefeng Yicun (822–908). Prime factions are the Hongzhou school and the Hubei faction An important text is the Anthology of the Patriarchal Hall (952), which gives a great amount of "encounter-stories", and the well-known genealogy of the Chán-school.
 Song Dynasty Chán (c. 950–1300). In this phase Chán took its definitive shape including the picture of the "golden age" of the Chán of the Tang-Dynasty, and the use of koans for individual study and meditation. Prime figures are Dahui Zonggao (1089–1163) who introduced the Hua Tou practice and Hongzhi Zhengjue (1091–1157) who emphasized Shikantaza. Prime factions are the Linji school and the Caodong school. The classic koan-collections, such as the Blue Cliff Record were assembled in this period, which reflect the influence of the "literati" on the development of Chán. In this phase Chán is transported to Japan, and exerts a great influence on Korean Seon via Jinul.

Neither Ferguson nor McRae give a periodisation for Chinese Chán following the Song-dynasty, though McRae mentions "at least a post-classical phase or perhaps multiple phases". According to David McMahan: During the Ming dynasty (1368–1644) and the Qing Dynasty (1644–1912) Chán was part of a larger, syncretic Buddhist culture. A final phase can be distinguished from the 19th century onward, when western imperialism had a growing influence in South-East Asia, including China. A side effect of this imperial influence was the modernisation of Asian religions, adapting them to western ideas and rhetorical strategies.

Origins

Before the arrival of the "founder" of Chan, Bodhidharma, various Buddhist masters of meditation or dhyana (i.e. Chan) had taught in China. These figures also brought with them various meditation texts, called the Dhyāna sutras (Chinese: 禪經 chan jing). These early meditation works mainly drew from the teachings of the Sarvāstivāda school of Kashmir. These texts include the translations of the Parthian An Shigao (147–168 CE) like the Anban shouyi jing (Sanskrit: Ānāpānasmṛti-sūtra), the numerous translations of Kumārajīva (334–413 CE, such as the Zuochan sanmei jing (Sutra of Sitting Dhyāna samādhi) and those of Buddhabhadra (like the Damoduoluo chan jing, Dharmatrāta Dhyāna sūtra). These early meditation texts laid the groundwork for the practices of Chan Buddhism (Zen) and the works of the Tiantai meditation master Zhiyi.

The translation work of Kumārajīva (especially his Prajñāpāramitā translations and his Vimalakirti Sutra),  Buddhabhadra (Avatamsaka Sutra) and Gunabhadra (Lankāvatāra sūtra) were also key formative influences on the origins of Chan. These Buddhist texts are some of the key sources for later Chan masters. Indeed, in some early Chan texts (like the Masters of the Lankāvatāra), it is Gunabhadra, not Bodhidharma, which is seen as the first patriarch who transmits the Chan lineage (here seen as synonymous with the Lankāvatāra tradition) from India. The meditation works of the fourth Tiantai patriarch Zhiyi, such as his monumental Mohezhiguan, were also important sources on later Chan meditation manuals, like the Tso-chan-i.

A further possible influence on the origin of Chan Buddhism is Taoism. Some of the earliest Chinese Buddhists were influenced by Daoist thought and terminology and this has led some scholars to see a Taoist influence on Chan. In his history of Zen, Heinrich Dumoulin argued that Chan Buddhist developed out of the confluence of Indian Mahayana and Chinese Taoism. Two Chinese disciples of Kumārajīva, Sengzhao and Tao Sheng were influenced by Taoist works like the Laozi and Zhuangzi. These Sanlun figures in turn had an influence on some early Chan masters.

Proto-Chán

Proto-Chán (c. 500–600) encompasses the Southern and Northern Dynasties period (420 to 589) and Sui Dynasty (589–618 CE). In this phase, Chán developed in multiple locations in northern China. It was based on the practice of dhyana and is connected to the figures of Bodhidharma, Seng-fu and Huike, though there is little actual historical information about these early figures and most legendary stories about their life come from later, mostly Tang sources. What is known is that they were considered Mahayana meditation masters.

An important text from this period is the Two Entrances and Four Practices, found in Dunhuang, and attributed to Bodhidharma. Later sources mention that these figures taught using the Laṅkāvatāra Sūtra though there is no direct evidence of this from the earliest sources. According to John McRae, the earliest Chan sources on these masters show considerable influence from Madhyamaka thought, while the influence from the Laṅkāvatāra Sūtra is actually much less pronounced and it is questionable if it was there at all with regards to the earliest figures like Bodhidharma and Huike.

Early Chán

Early Chán refers to early Tang Dynasty (618–750) Chán. The fifth patriarch Daman Hongren (601–674), and his dharma-heir Yuquan Shenxiu (606?–706) were influential in founding the first Chan institution in Chinese history, known as the "East Mountain school" (Dongshan famen). Hongren taught the practice of shou-hsin, "maintaining (guarding) the mind," in which "an awareness of True Mind or Buddha-nature within" is maintained, "[exhorting] the practitioners to
unremittingly apply themselves to the practice of meditation."

Shenxiu was the most influential and charismatic student of Hongren, he was even invited to the Imperial Court by Empress Wu. Shenxiu also became the target of much criticism by Shenhui (670–762), for his "gradualist" teachings. Shenhui instead promoted the "sudden" teachings of his teacher Huineng (638–713) as well as what later became a very influential Chán classic called the Platform Sutra. Shenhui's propaganda campaign eventually succeeded in elevating Huineng to the status of sixth patriarch of Chinese Chán. The sudden vs. gradual debate that developed in this era came to define later forms of Chan Buddhism.

Middle Chán

The Middle Chán (c. 750–1000) period runs from the An Lushan Rebellion (755–763) to the Five Dynasties and Ten Kingdoms period (907–960/979). This phase saw the development new schools of Chan. The most important of these schools is the Hongzhou school of Mazu Daoyi (709–788), to which also belong Shitou, Baizhang, and Huangbo. This school is sometimes seen as the archetypal expression of Chán, with its emphasis on the personal expression of insight, and its rejection of positive statements, as well as the importance it placed on spontaneous and unconventional "questions and answers during an encounter" (linji wenda) between master and disciple.

However, modern scholars have seen much of the literature that presents these "iconoclastic" encounters as being later revisions during the Song era, and instead see the Hongzhou masters as not being very radical, instead promoting pretty conservative ideas, such as keeping precepts, accumulating good karma and practicing meditation. The school did produce innovative teachings and perspectives such as Mazu's views that "this mind is Buddha" and that "ordinary mind is the way", which were also critiqued by later figures, such as the influential Guifeng Zongmi (780–841), for failing to differentiate between ignorance and enlightenment.

By the end of the late Tang, the Hongzhou school was gradually superseded by various regional traditions, which became known as the Five Houses of Chán. Shitou Xiqian (710–790) is regarded as the Patriarch of Cáodòng (Jp. Sōtō) school, while Linji Yixuan (died 867) is regarded as the founder of Línjì (Jp. Rinzai) school. Both of these traditions were quite influential both in and outside of China. Another influential Chán master of the late Tang was Xuefeng Yicun. During the later Tang, the practice of the "encounter dialogue" reached its full maturity. These formal dialogues between master and disciple may have used absurd, illogical and iconoclastic language as well as non-verbal forms of communication such as the drawing of circles and physical gestures like shouting and hitting.

It was also common to write fictional encounter dialogues and attribute them to previous Chán figures. An important text from this period is the Anthology of the Patriarchal Hall (952), which gives many "encounter-stories", as well as establishing a genealogy of the Chán school. The Great Anti-Buddhist Persecution in 845 was devastating for metropolitan Chan, but the Chan school of Mazu survived, and took a leading role in the Chan of the later Tang.

Song Dynasty Chán

During Song Dynasty Chán (c. 950–1300), Chán Buddhism took its definitive shape, through the development of the use of koans for individual study and meditation. It was also during the Song that Chan literati developed their own idealized history of Chan, particularly promoting the idea of a Tang "golden age" of Chan. During the Song, Chán became the largest sect of Chinese Buddhism and had strong ties to the imperial government, which led to the development of a highly organized system of temple rank and administration.

The dominant form of Song Chán was the Linji school due to support from the scholar-official class and the imperial court. This school developed the study of gong'an ("public case") literature, which depicted stories of master-student encounters that were seen as demonstrations of the awakened mind. Most of these stories depicted the idealized encounters of past Chan masters, particularly from the Tang era, and show the influence of the Chinese literati class. The most influential of these works are the Blue Cliff Record, the Book of Equanimity and The Gateless Gate.

During the 12th century, a rivalry emerged between the Linji and the Caodong schools for the support of the scholar-official class. Hongzhi Zhengjue (1091–1157) of the Caodong school emphasized silent illumination or serene reflection (mòzhào) as a means for solitary practice, which could be undertaken by lay-followers. The Linji school's Dahui Zonggao (1089–1163) meanwhile, introduced k'an-hua chan ("observing the word-head" chan), which involved meditation on the crucial phrase or "punch line" (hua-tou) of a gong'an.

The Song also saw the syncretism of Chán and Pure Land Buddhism by Yongming Yanshou (904–975), which would later become extremely influential. Yongming also echoed Zongmi's work in indicating that the values of Taoism and Confucianism could also be embraced and integrated into Buddhism. Chán also influenced Neo-Confucianism as well as certain forms of Taoism, such as the Quanzhen school.

During the Song, Chán was also transported to Japan by figures like Eisai and exerted a great influence on Korean Seon via Jinul.

Post-Classical Chán
During the Ming Dynasty, the Chán school was so dominant that all Chinese monks were affiliated with either the Linji school or the Caodong school.

Some scholars see the post-classical phase as being an "age of syncretism." The post-classical period saw the increasing popularity of the dual practice of Chán and Pure Land Buddhism (known as nianfo Chan), as seen in the teachings of Zhongfeng Mingben (1263–1323) and the great reformer Hanshan Deqing (1546–1623). This became a widespread phenomenon and in time much of the distinction between them was lost, with many monasteries teaching both Chán meditation and the Pure Land practice of nianfo.

The Ming dynasty also saw the efforts of figures such as Yunqi Zhuhong (1535–1615) and Daguan Zhenke (1543–1603) to revive and reconcile Chan Buddhism with the practice of Buddhist scriptural study and writing.

In the beginning of the Qing Dynasty, Chán was "reinvented", by the "revival of beating and shouting practices" by Miyun Yuanwu (1566–1642), and the publication of the Wudeng yantong ("The strict transmission of the five Chan schools") by Feiyin Tongrong's (1593–1662), a dharma heir of Miyun Yuanwu. The book placed self-proclaimed Chan monks without proper Dharma transmission in the category of "lineage unknown" (sifa weixiang), thereby excluding several prominent Caodong monks.

Modern era

After further centuries of decline during the Qing Dynasty (1644–1912), Chán activity was revived again in the 19th and 20th centuries by a flurry of modernist activity. This period saw the rise of worldly Chan activism, what is sometimes called Humanistic Buddhism (or more literally "Buddhism for human life", rensheng fojiao), promoted by figures like Jing'an (1851–1912), Yuanying (1878–1953), Taixu (1890–1947), Xuyun (1840–1959) and Yinshun (1906–2005). These figures promoted social activism to address issues such as poverty and social injustice, as well as participation in political movements. They also promoted modern science and scholarship, including the use of the methods of modern critical scholarship to study the history of Chan.

Many Chán teachers today trace their lineage back to Xuyun, including Sheng-yen and Hsuan Hua, who have propagated Chán in the West where it has grown steadily through the 20th and 21st centuries. Chán Buddhism was repressed in China during the 1960s in the Cultural Revolution, but in the subsequent reform and opening up period in the 1970s, a revival of Chinese Buddhism has been taking place on the mainland, while Buddhism has a significant following in Taiwan and Hong Kong as well as among Overseas Chinese.

Spread outside of China

Vietnamese Thiền

Chan was introduced to Vietnam during the early Chinese occupation periods (111 BCE to 939 CE) as Thiền. During the Lý (1009–1225) and Trần (1225 to 1400) dynasties, Thiền rose to prominence among the elites and the royal court and a new native tradition was founded, the Trúc Lâm ("Bamboo Grove") school, which also contained Confucian and Taoist influences. In the 17th century, the Linji school was brought to Vietnam as the Lâm Tế, which also mixed Chan and Pure land. Lâm Tế remains the largest monastic order in the country today.

Modern Vietnamese Thiền is influenced by Buddhist modernism. Important figures include Thiền master Thích Thanh Từ (1924–), the activist and popularizer Thích Nhất Hạnh (1926–2022) and the philosopher Thích Thiên-Ân. Vietnamese Thiền is eclectic and inclusive, bringing in many practices such as breath meditation, nianfo, mantra, Theravada influences, chanting, sutra recitation and engaged Buddhism activism.

Korean Seon

Seon (선) was gradually transmitted into Korea during the late Silla period (7th through 9th centuries) as Korean monks began to travel to China to learn the newly developing Chan tradition of Mazu Daoyi and returned home to establish the Chan school. They established the initial Seon schools of Korea, which were known as the "nine mountain schools" (九山, gusan).

Seon received its most significant impetus and consolidation from the Goryeo monk Jinul (1158–1210), who is considered the most influential figure in the formation of the mature Seon school. He founded the Jogye Order, which remains the largest Seon tradition in Korea today. Jinul founded the Songgwangsa temple as a new center of Seon study and practice. Jinul also wrote extensive works on Seon, developing a comprehensive system of thought and practice. From Dahui Zonggao, Jinul adopted the hwadu method, which remains the main meditation form taught in Seon today.

Buddhism was mostly suppressed during the strictly Confucian Joseon Dynasty (1392–1910), and the number of monasteries and clergy sharply declined. The period of Japanese occupation also brought numerous modernist ideas and changes to Korean Seon. Some monks began to adopt the Japanese practice of marrying and having families, while others such as Yongseong, worked to resist the Japanese occupation. Today, the largest Seon school, the Jogye, enforces celibacy, while the second largest, the Taego Order, allows for married priests. Important modernist figures that influenced contemporary Seon include Seongcheol and Gyeongheo. Seon has also been transmitted to West, with new traditions such as the Kwan Um School of Zen.

Japanese Zen

Zen was not introduced as a separate school until the 12th century, when Myōan Eisai traveled to China and returned to establish a Linji lineage, which eventually perished. Decades later,  (1235–1308) also studied Linji teachings in China before founding the Japanese Otokan lineage, the most influential and only surviving lineage of Rinzai in Japan. In 1215, Dōgen, a younger contemporary of Eisai's, journeyed to China himself, where he became a disciple of the Caodong master Tiantong Rujing. After his return, Dōgen established the Sōtō school, the Japanese branch of Caodong.

Of these, Sōtō is the largest, and Ōbaku the smallest, with Rinzai in the middle. These schools are further divided into subschools by head temple, with two head temples for Sōtō (Sōji-ji and Eihei-ji, with Sōji-ji having a much larger network), fourteen head temples for Rinzai, and one head temple (Manpuku-ji) for Ōbaku, for a total of 17 head temples. The Rinzai head temples, which are most numerous, have substantial overlap with the traditional Five Mountain System, and include Myoshin-ji, Nanzen-ji, Tenryū-ji, Daitoku-ji, and Tofuku-ji, among others.

Besides these traditional organizations, there are modern Zen organizations that have especially attracted Western lay followers, namely the Sanbo Kyodan and the FAS Society.

Zen in the West

Although it is difficult to trace the precise moment when the West first became aware of Zen as a distinct form of Buddhism, the visit of Soyen Shaku, a Japanese Zen monk, to Chicago during the World Parliament of Religions in 1893 is often pointed to as an event that enhanced the profile of Zen in the Western world. It was during the late 1950s and the early 1960s that the number of Westerners other than the descendants of Asian immigrants who were pursuing a serious interest in Zen began to reach a significant level. Japanese Zen has gained the greatest popularity in the West. The various books on Zen by Reginald Horace Blyth, Alan Watts, Philip Kapleau and D. T. Suzuki published between 1950 and 1975, contributed to this growing interest in Zen in the West, as did the interest on the part of beat poets such as Jack Kerouac, Allen Ginsberg and Gary Snyder. In 1958, the literary magazine Chicago Review played a significant role in introducing Zen to the American literary community when it published a special issue on Zen featuring the aforementioned beat poets and works in translation. Erich Fromm quotes D. T. Suzuki in his 1960 book Psychoanalysis and Zen Buddhism.

The publication in 1974 of Zen and the Art of Motorcycle Maintenance by American writer Robert Pirsig brought the application of Zen thinking into a way of understanding non dualism in a practical sense. Drawing on a wide range of philosophical and logical sources, the book became the biggest selling work on philosophy ever published.

See also
 List of Buddhists
 Outline of Buddhism
 Timeline of Buddhism
 Chinese Chán
 101 Zen Stories
 Chinso
 Shussan Shaka
 Katsu

Notes

References

Sources
 Printed sources

 
 
 
 
 
 

 
 
 
 
 
 
 
 Braak, Andre van der.  Reimagining Zen in a Secular age: Charles Taylor and Zen Buddhism in the West (Brill Rodopi,  2020) online review

Further reading
 Modern popular works

 D.T. Suzuki, Essays in Zen Buddhism, First Series (1927), Second Series (1933), Third Series (1934)
 R. H. Blyth, Zen and Zen Classics, 5 volumes (1960–1970; reprints of works from 1942 into the 1960s)
 Alan Watts, The Way of Zen (1957)
 Lu K'uan Yu (Charles Luk), Ch'an and Zen Teachings, 3 vols (1960, 1971, 1974), The Transmission of the Mind: Outside the Teaching (1974)
 Paul Reps & Nyogen Senzaki, Zen Flesh, Zen Bones (1957)
 Philip Kapleau, The Three Pillars of Zen (1966)
 Shunryu Suzuki, Zen Mind, Beginner's Mind (1970)
 Katsuki Sekida, Zen Training: Methods & Philosophy (1975)

 Classic historiography
 Dumoulin, Heinrich (2005), Zen Buddhism: A History. Volume 1: India and China. World Wisdom Books.
 Dumoulin, Heinrich (2005), Zen Buddhism: A History. Volume 2: Japan. World Wisdom Books.

 Critical historiography

Overview
 
Formation of Chán in Tang & Song China
 
 
 

Japan
 

Modern times
 

Orientalism and East-West interchange
 
 
 McMahan, David L. (2008), The Making of Buddhist Modernism. Oxford University Press.

 Contemporary practice

External links

 thezensite
 Zen Buddhism WWW Virtual Library
 Chart of (Asian) Zen schools
 Glossary of Japanese Zen terms
 Stanford Encyclopedia of Philosophy: entry on Japanese Zen Buddhism
What is Zen Buddhism?

 
Nondualism
Yogacara
Buddhism in the Kamakura period
Buddhism in the Muromachi period